OpenWebBeans is an open source, embeddable and lightweight CDI Container, released under the Apache License 2.0. OpenWebBeans is an ASL-licensed implementation of Context and Dependency Injection for Java EE Platform Specification which is defined by JSR-299, JSR-346, and JSR-365. OpenWebBeans has been integrated with Java EE application servers such as Geronimo and Apache TomEE.

History
OpenWebBeans was founded by Gurkan Erdogdu in October 2008. It is one of implementation of the Context and Dependency Injection specification. The incubator proposal can be found here,. It was graduated in December 2009 to become a top level ASF project.

Versions

See also
Context and Dependency Injection (CDI)

References

External links
 

OpenWebBeans
Java enterprise platform
Free software application servers